Suez Canal Container Terminal (SCCT) is a container terminal located at Port Said East and functions as a transshipment centre for the Eastern Mediterranean at the northern entrance to the Suez Canal. The terminal has been operational since October 2004. Suez Canal Container Terminal (SCCT) is a private joint venture company that obtained the concession to build, operate, and manage this new terminal. The majority (55%) shareholding of SCCT is held by APM Terminals. 20% of the shares are held by COSCO, 10% are held by Suez Canal & Affiliates, 5% by the National Bank of Egypt (NBE), and the remaining 10% are held by the Egyptian private sector.

History 
The Egyptian government signed a concession agreement for a term of 30 years in relation to the need for a container terminal in Port Said. In 2002, Egypt ratified an additional concession agreement, following earlier approval of terminal design in 2001.

Construction on the SCCT first started in 2003, and a target date of October 1 of the following year was established. The Suez Canal Container Terminal became operational in October 2004.

In 2007, the Egyptian government signed a concession agreement for the progression of "Phase II" of the SCCT facility.

See also 
APM Terminals
A. P. Moller-Maersk Group
Port Said Port Authority

References

External links 
SCCT Suez Canal Container Terminal

2000 establishments in Egypt
Container Terminal, Suez Canal Container Terminal
Transport companies of Egypt
Water transport in Egypt
Ports and harbours of Egypt
Transport companies established in 2000
Container terminals
Port Said
APM Terminals